WTVY may refer to:

WTVY (TV), a television station (channel 4) licensed to Dothan, Alabama, United States
WTVY-FM, a radio station (95.5 FM) licensed to Dothan, Alabama, United States